Harold Edward Eaton Jr. (born August 25, 1955) is a Vermont lawyer and jurist who was appointed to the Vermont Supreme Court in 2014.

Biography
Harold Edward Eaton Jr. (nicknamed "Duke") was born in Windsor, Vermont on August 25, 1955.  He attended elementary and junior high school in Woodstock, and graduated from Woodstock Union High School in 1973.  Eaton graduated from the University of Vermont in 1977 with a Bachelor of Science degree in Education.  He is a 1980 graduate of Vermont Law School.

From 1980 to 1982 Eaton was a Deputy State's Attorney for Chittenden County, and he was Chief Deputy State's Attorney from 1982 to 1983.  He practiced law in Rutland from 1983 to 1991.  Eaton was a partner in Eaton & Hayes of Woodstock from 1991 to 2004.

Eaton was appointed a Judge of the Vermont Superior Court by Governor Jim Douglas on April 16, 2004.  On October 27, 2014 Governor Peter Shumlin swore Eaton in as an associate justice of the Vermont Supreme Court.  Eaton replaced Geoffrey W. Crawford who was appointed Judge of the United States District Court for the District of Vermont.

References

External links
Biography, Honorable Harold E. Eaton, Jr. at Vermont Judiciary

1955 births
Living people
People from Woodstock, Vermont
University of Vermont alumni
Vermont Law and Graduate School alumni
Vermont lawyers
Vermont state court judges
Justices of the Vermont Supreme Court
21st-century American judges